Bakun, officially the Municipality of Bakun, , is a 3rd class municipality in the province of Benguet, Philippines. According to the 2020 census, it has a population of 14,535 people.

History
During the Spanish Period, Bakun was a rancheria of the Commandancia Politico-Militar de Amburayan. Ampusongan (currently a barangay of Bakun) was a rancheria of the Commandancia Politico Militar de Tiagan, Distrito de Benguet.

When the United States took control of the Philippines, the American Congress issued Act No. 48 in November 1900, placing Bakun under the province of Amburayan, and Ampusongan under the province of Benguet. On August 13, 1908, Benguet became a subprovince of the newly established Mountain Province with the enactment of Act No. 1876, and the municipal districts of Bakun and Ampusongan became part of the subprovince.

In 1917, the Bureau of Non-Christian Tribes recommended that the western border of the Mountain Province be pushed eastward, such that the entire subprovince of Amburayan and large slices of Lepanto and Benguet would be made part of Ilocos Sur and La Union. In early 1937, Ampusongan was merged with Bakun, the latter carrying the name of the township while the former became a barangay. The issuance of Republic Act No. 4695 in 1966 included Bakun as a regular municipality in the newly created province of Benguet.

Geography
It is bounded by Mankayan on the east, Buguias on the southeast, Kibungan on the south, Sugpon on the south-west, Alilem on the north-west, and Cervantes on the north.

According to the Philippine Statistics Authority, the municipality has a land area of  constituting  of the  total area of Benguet.

Barangays
Bakun is politically subdivided into 7 barangays. These barangays are headed by elected officials: Barangay Captain, Barangay Council, whose members are called Barangay Councilors. All are elected every three years.

Climate

Demographics

In the 2020 census, Bakun had a population of 14,535.

Economy

Government
Bakun, belonging to the lone congressional district of the province of Benguet, is governed by a mayor designated as its local chief executive and by a municipal council as its legislative body in accordance with the Local Government Code. The mayor, vice mayor, and the councilors are elected directly by the people through an election which is being held every three years.

Elected officials

Education

Public schools
As of 2015, Bakun has 30 public elementary schools and 4 public secondary schools.

Notes

References

External links

 [ Philippine Standard Geographic Code]

Municipalities of Benguet